Declan Frith (born 16 May 2002) is an English footballer who plays as a left-back or midfielder for Aston Villa's under-21 side. He has previously played for the academy sides of Welling United and Chelsea.

Club career

Early career
Having trialled with Charlton Athletic, Bromley and Sutton United, Frith failed to find a club to sign a professional contract with after leaving school. A further trial at Southend United would also prove unsuccessful, and he eventually settled at non-league Welling United.

A change in FIFA regulations and the effects of Brexit meant that Premier League side Chelsea had to branch out their scouting network, notably bringing in a number of young, non-league players. As a result of this, Frith was offered a trial with the West London-based club in February 2021, and signed in May of the same year.

Used sparingly on either the left or right sides of midfield, Frith managed a total of five appearances for Chelsea's under-23 side, including featuring in an EFL Trophy game against Exeter City. After initially being set for release at the end of the 2020–21 season, Frith continued to feature for Chelsea's youth teams. He eventually left the club at the end of August 2021, and signed a professional contract with fellow Premier League side Aston Villa on 13 October 2021. He settled quickly into the youth team of his new club, notably scoring twice on his debut against West Midlands rivals Birmingham City U23s. He followed this up with a hat-trick against Coventry Sphinx in the first round of the Birmingham Senior Cup.

Career statistics
.

References

2002 births
Living people
English footballers
Association football defenders
Association football midfielders
Welling United F.C. players
Chelsea F.C. players
Aston Villa F.C. players